Tulio Etchemaite (born 10 July 1987 in Argentina) is an Argentinean footballer who now plays for Portuguesa in Venezuela.

Career
Etchemaite started his senior career with Club Atlético River Plate. In 2010, he signed for Aragua in the Venezuelan Primera División, where he made thirty-two league appearances and scored three goals. After that, he played for Deportivo Anzoátegui S.C., C.S. Herediano, Boca Río Gallegos, Club Atlético Alvarado, Club Atlético Güemes, Portuguesa, Asociación Civil Deportivo Lara, Carabobo, Lincoln Red Imps, Sport Rosario, FBC Melgar, Carlos A. Mannucci, and Atlético Grau.

References

External links 
 Tulio Etchemaite: "In River I had my moment and I couldn't take advantage of it"
 Tulio Etchemaite with the faith of a goalscorer in Melgar
 Tulio Etchemaite: The post is Tulio
 Tulio Etchemaite se solidarizó con sus ex compañeros de Sport Rosario

Living people
1987 births
Argentine footballers
Argentine expatriate footballers
Deportivo Morón footballers
Club Atlético Alvarado players
Carabobo F.C. players
Atlético Grau footballers
Portuguesa F.C. players
Sport Rosario footballers
FBC Melgar footballers
Carlos A. Mannucci players
Aragua FC players
Asociación Civil Deportivo Lara players
C.S. Herediano footballers
Deportivo Anzoátegui players
Lincoln Red Imps F.C. players
Venezuelan Primera División players
Peruvian Primera División players
Liga FPD players
Expatriate footballers in Peru
Expatriate footballers in Venezuela
Expatriate footballers in Costa Rica
Expatriate footballers in Gibraltar
Association football forwards